Drums of Death may refer to:

Drums of Death (musician), real name Colin Bailey, British electronic musician
Drums of Death (album), a 2005 album by DJ Spooky and Dave Lombardo
 "Guns Blazing (Drums of Death, Pt. 1)" and "The Knock (Drums of Death, Pt. 2)", songs from the 1998 UNKLE album Psyence Fiction